USS ATA-216 was an  of the United States Navy built in 1944. The ship was commissioned on 30 October 1944. ATA-216 had a brief naval career, and was decommissioned on 26 March 1946.

Construction 
Originally planned as the  Allthorn (YN-94), she was laid down on 31 October 1943 at Slidell, Louisiana by the Canulette Shipbuilding Company. On 20 January 1944 she was redesignated as an auxiliary net laying ship, Allthorn (AN-70), and launched on 27 May. On 12 August her name was cancelled, she was again repurposed, to the ATA-214-class auxiliary ocean tug ATA-216, and commissioned as such on 30 October 1944.

Naval service 
ATA-216 served in the Pacific Theater and, after the surrender of Japan, briefly in the Occupation Service in the Far East, until 20 October 1945.  The tug was decommissioned on 26 March 1946 and later struck from the Navy List.

Commercial service 
In 1948 the tug was sold to unidentified American interests and renamed Kara Gay, and then registered in 1951 to Walter H Wilms & Company of Portland, Oregon, allocated Official Number 262382, and renamed El Sol. After three years she was bought by the Portland Tug & Barge Company, and then resold in 1956 to the New York City-based De Long Corporation, which registered her in Panama, still with the same name, El Sol.

References  

 

ATA-214-class tugs
Ships built in Slidell, Louisiana
1944 ships
World War II auxiliary ships of the United States